Leicestershire Police is the territorial police force responsible for policing Leicestershire and Rutland in England.  Its headquarters are at Enderby, Leicestershire.

History

Leicestershire Police was formed in 1839. In 1951 it amalgamated with Rutland Constabulary to form Leicestershire and Rutland Constabulary and in 1967 merged with Leicester City Police to form Leicester and Rutland Constabulary. After the Local Government Act 1972 came into force in 1974 it was renamed Leicestershire Constabulary. In 2012 it changed to Leicestershire Police to be 'in keeping with modern policing'.

In 1965, Leicestershire and Rutland Constabulary had an establishment of 748 officers and an actual strength of 659.

Proposals made by the Home Secretary on 20 March 2006, would have seen the force merge with the other four East Midlands forces to form a strategic police force for the entire region. These plans were dropped in 2007.

In 2015, the force attempted to carry out a covert CCTV face recognition surveillance operation at the Download Festival, in which festival-goers would have their faces compared with a database of custody images, and only informed about the surveillance afterwards. The operation was inadvertently revealed in the magazine Police Oracle before the festival took place. The aim of the operation was to identify organised gangs of pickpockets deliberately targeting festivals across Europe.

Chief constables
 the chief constable is Rob Nixon.

The chief constables of Leicestershire have been:
 1839–1876: Frederick Goodyer (first Chief Constable of Leicestershire) 
 1876–1889: Captain Roland Vincent Sylvester Grimston
 1889–1928: Edward Holmes
 1928–1949: Major Cecil Eagles Lynch-Blosse
 1950–1972: John A Taylor
 1972–1986: Alan Goodson
 1986–1993: Michael John Hirst 
 1993–1997: Keith Povey 
 1997–2001: David Wyrko
 2001–2010: Matthew Baggott 
 2010–2022: Simon Cole
 2022present: Rob Nixon

Officers killed in the line of duty

The Police Roll of Honour Trust and Police Memorial Trust list and commemorate all British police officers killed in the line of duty. Since its establishment in 1984, the Police Memorial Trust has erected 50 memorials nationally to some of those officers.

The following officers of Leicestershire Police are listed by the Trust as having died attempting to prevent, stop or solve a crime:
PCs Bryan Reginald Moore and Andrew Carl Munn, 2002 (fatally injured when their vehicle was rammed during a police pursuit)
Sergeant Brian Dawson, 1975 (shot dead upon arrival at reports of a man firing into the street)
PC William Adiel Wilkinson, 1903 (shot dead in ambush by men who bore police a grudge)
PC Thomas George Barrett, 1886 (beaten to death by a man he spoke to about non-payment of a fine).

Local Policing Units

The local policing units for Leicestershire Police are as follows:

City:
City Centre – Mansfield House
City South – Euston Street
City East – Highfields, Keyham Lane
City West – Beaumont Leys, Hinckley Road

County:
North West Leicestershire – Coalville
Charnwood – Loughborough
Melton & Rutland – Melton Mowbray
Hinckley & Blaby – Braunstone, Hinckley
Harborough – Market Harborough
Oadby and Wigston – Wigston

Uniform

 Black operational shirt for Constables and a blue operational shirt for PCSOs
 Epaulettes (black for Officers and blue for PCSOs) showing name and collar number
 Black operational combat trousers
 White operational shirt for senior officers and ceremonial use
 Custodian helmet or bowler hat for constables and sergeants
 Peaked hat or bowler for PCSOs
 White peaked cap for officers attached to the Roads Policing Unit (RPU)
 Peaked caps or bowlers for senior officers 
 Bump caps for all officers 
 Reflective or black protective body armour vest
 Modular carriage system for body armour or tactical belt to carry equipment

PEEL inspection 2022
Her Majesty's Inspectorate of Constabulary and Fire & Rescue Services (HMICFRS) conducts a periodic police effectiveness, efficiency and legitimacy (PEEL) inspection of each police service's performance. In its latest PEEL inspection, Leicestershire Police was rated as follows:

See also
Leicestershire Police and Crime Commissioner
List of law enforcement agencies in the United Kingdom, Crown Dependencies and British Overseas Territories
Law enforcement in the United Kingdom

References

External links

 Leicestershire Police at HMICFRS
Day in the life of Chief Constable Simon Cole from BBC Radio Leicester
Leicestershire Constabulary Roll of Honour

Police forces of England
Police
Constabulary
Government agencies established in 1839
1839 establishments in England